Ron Silver (25 February 1910 – 22 June 1984) was a New Zealand cricketer. He played fourteen first-class matches for Otago between 1935 and 1946.

See also
 List of Otago representative cricketers

References

External links
 

1910 births
1984 deaths
New Zealand cricketers
Otago cricketers
Cricketers from Dunedin